Meriola decepta is a species of true spider in the family Trachelidae. It is found in a range from the United States to Guatemala, Colombia, Ecuador, Peru, and Brazil.

References

Trachelidae
Articles created by Qbugbot
Spiders described in 1895
Taxa named by Nathan Banks